The W. T. Waggoner Building is a historical skyscraper in Fort Worth, Texas.

Location
It is located at 810 Houston Street in Fort Worth, Tarrant County, Texas.

History
The skyscraper was built from 1919 to 1920 for William Thomas Waggoner, the owner of the Waggoner Ranch and of the Waggoner Refinery. It is 70.10 meter-high, with twenty floors. It was designed by the architectural team Sanguinet & Staats. It cost US$1,500,000.

From 1920 to 1957, Continental National Bank had an office in the building. The building is owned by XTO Energy.

It was renovated in 1985.

Heritage significance
It has been listed on the National Register of Historic Places since July 10, 1979.

See also

National Register of Historic Places listings in Tarrant County, Texas

References

External links

Architecture in Fort Worth: W.T. Waggoner Building

Office buildings on the National Register of Historic Places in Texas
Buildings and structures in Tarrant County, Texas
Sanguinet & Staats buildings
National Register of Historic Places in Fort Worth, Texas
Skyscraper office buildings in Fort Worth, Texas
Office buildings completed in 1920
Chicago school architecture in Texas